Ilkhom Bakhromov (born 7 January 1997) is an Uzbekistani Greco-Roman wrestler. He won the gold medal in the men's 55 kg event at the 2019 Asian Wrestling Championships held in Xi'an, China.

In 2014, he won the gold medal in the men's 50 kg event at the Summer Youth Olympics held in Nanjing, China. In 2021, he won the silver medal in the 55 kg event at the Grand Prix Zagreb Open held in Zagreb, Croatia.

Achievements

References

External links 
 

Living people
1997 births
Place of birth missing (living people)
Uzbekistani male sport wrestlers
Wrestlers at the 2014 Summer Youth Olympics
Youth Olympic gold medalists for Uzbekistan
Asian Wrestling Championships medalists
20th-century Uzbekistani people
21st-century Uzbekistani people